Isaac Townsend ( – 21 November 1765) was an admiral in the British Royal Navy and a Member of Parliament.

A post-captain from 1720, Townsend commanded various ships. As captain of HMS Shrewsbury he took part in the expedition against Cartagena in 1741. He was promoted to rear admiral in 1744, vice admiral in 1746 and admiral in 1747. He was also an Elder Brother of Trinity House.

He entered Parliament in 1744 as member for the naval port of Portsmouth, and represented that town until 1754. He did not stand for re-election in 1754, when the Admiralty supported two other admirals as its candidates. He became governor of Greenwich Hospital in 1754, and in this capacity in 1757 he had custody of Admiral Byng, who was under arrest there before his court-martial. After Byng's execution, Townsend was chosen to take his place as MP for Rochester, another borough in the Admiralty's gift, and was MP for that city for the rest of his life. He was regarded as a reliable voter for the government, but seems never to have spoken in the House.

He was elected a Fellow of the Royal Society in February 1750.

Townsend married Elizabeth Larcum, daughter of William Larcum, a surgeon, and they had one son and one daughter. He died in 1765.

He is frequently confused with his uncle, a naval officer also named Isaac Townsend (d.1731) who is commemorated by a substantial memorial in the north transept of Winchester Cathedral.

References

General
 Concise Dictionary of National Biography (1930)
Robert Beatson, A Chronological Register of Both Houses of Parliament (London: Longman, Hurst, Res & Orme, 1807) 
 Lewis Namier & John Brooke, The History of Parliament: The House of Commons 1754–1790 (London: HMSO, 1964)

External links
 
 Portrait, possibly of Isaac Townsend, at the National Maritime Museum

Year of birth uncertain
1765 deaths
Members of the Parliament of Great Britain for English constituencies
Fellows of the Royal Society
Royal Navy admirals
British MPs 1741–1747
British MPs 1747–1754
British MPs 1754–1761
British MPs 1761–1768
Members of Trinity House